Denmark competed at the 2000 Summer Olympics in Sydney, Australia.

Medalist

Archery

Athletics

Men
Track & road events

Field events

Women
Field events

Badminton

Camilla Martin won Denmark's only medal in the Women's Singles event. She took the silver after losing to Gong Zhichao of China in the finals.
Men

Women

Mixed

Canoeing

Sprint
Men

Cycling

Road

Track
Points race

Mountain biking

Equestrian

Dressage

Eventing

Show jumping

Handball

Women

Preliminary round
For the preliminary round, the ten teams were distributed into two groups of five teams. Each team played against each of its four group opponents for a total of four matches. The four best-scoring teams advanced to the quarter-finals.

Group B

Quarterfinals

Semifinals

Gold medal game

Modern Pentathlon

In June 2000, Pernille Svarre became world pentathlon champion, winning gold at the championship in Pesaro, Italy. The same year, she was the first Danish woman to compete in the modern pentathlon at the Summer Olympics where the discipline was included for the first time.

Rowing

Men

Women

Sailing

Denmark competed in seven events during the Sailing competition in Sydney and won one gold medal.
Men

Women

Open

Match racing

Shooting

Men

Women

Swimming

Men

Women

Table tennis

Doubles

Taekwondo

Denmark has qualified a single taekwondo jin.

Tennis

Triathlon

References
sports-reference
Wallechinsky, David (2004). The Complete Book of the Summer Olympics (Athens 2004 Edition). Toronto, Canada. . 
International Olympic Committee (2001). The Results. Retrieved 12 November 2005.
Sydney Organising Committee for the Olympic Games (2001). Official Report of the XXVII Olympiad Volume 1 – Preparing for the Games. Retrieved 20 November 2005.
Sydney Organising Committee for the Olympic Games (2001). Official Report of the XXVII Olympiad Volume 2 – Celebrating the Games. Retrieved 20 November 2005.
Sydney Organising Committee for the Olympic Games (2001). The Results. Retrieved 20 November 2005.
International Olympic Committee Web Site

Nations at the 2000 Summer Olympics
2000 Summer Olympics
Summer Olympics